James Mosley (born 1935) is a retired librarian and historian whose work has specialised in the history of printing and letter design.

The main part of Mosley's career has been 42 years as Librarian of the St Bride Printing Library in London, where he curated and worked to expand the museum's large collection of printing and lettering materials, books and examples. This collection greatly expanded with the close of the metal type era, which saw many companies and printing shops selling off their equipment and archives. Mosley also expanded the library's collection of lettering and signs. He has also been a lecturer and professor at the University of Reading since 1964, and founded the British Printing Historical Society in that year.

Particular areas of focus of his career have been, in Britain, William Caslon, Vincent Figgins and Talbot Baines Reed, Eric Gill (with whose brother Evan he worked in the 1950s), and, in Europe, the Romain du Roi.

Education
Mosley grew up in Twickenham in south-west London, where he became interested in printing, before studying English at King's College, Cambridge, where he with Philip Gaskell, later also a historian of printing, operated a small hand-press as an amateur project in the college cellar. During his time at university he worked with Eric Gill's brother Evan on sorting material for an exhibition on his work by Monotype, a printing equipment company with which Gill often collaborated.

Career
After a brief period working at the type foundry Stevens Shanks, one of the last remaining in London, Mosley was hired at St. Bride as assistant librarian in 1956, becoming librarian in 1958. As a writer, two of his most famous articles are 'English Vernacular', on signpainting and lettering traditions, and 'The Nymph and the Grot', on the early development of sans-serif letters before they became adopted by printers, which was later republished as a book. He has collaborated with historians on other projects, for example on a study of the early printing of works by Hume and with Justin Howes. He also worked with Harry Carter, and has also contributed to a book on his son Matthew.

Mosley helped to acquire for St. Bride a large range of printing materials, at a time when companies were disposing of their hot metal typesetting and foundry type equipment or going out of business altogether. This included material from Monotype, H. W. Caslon & Company, Figgins and the Chiswick Press, as well as materials from printing shops including the collections of Oxford University Press and the Victoria & Albert Museum, supplementing the personal collections of William Blades and Talbot Baines Reed which the library already owned. He has also advised on revivals of historic typefaces and lettering, for example one of traditional French metal stencil lettering.

Since retirement from St. Bride Mosley has continued to write, research and lecture, for example on the career of Eric Gill in 2015. He also advised on creating historically accurate lettering for replica globes, Tate Britain and HMS Victory.

References

External links
 Personal blog
 Photographs
Mosley's Type, Lettering and Calligraphy reading lists:
 1450-1830 reading list
 1830-2000 reading list

Alumni of King's College, Cambridge
Living people
English historians
English art historians
English librarians
Academics of the University of Reading
1935 births
Historians of printing